Uralskoye is a rural locality (a selo) and the administrative center of Uralskoye Rural Settlement, Chaykovsky, Perm Krai, Russia. The population was 882 as of 2010. There are 7 streets.

References 

Rural localities in Chaykovsky urban okrug